Spain took part in the Eurovision Song Contest 1971. The country was represented by Karina with the song "En un mundo nuevo". Karina was selected through the competition Pasaporte a Dublín ("Passport to Dublin"), and the song she would sing in Dublin was internally chosen once the national final was over. The music was composed by Rafael Trabucchelli and the lyrics written by Tony Luz.

Before Eurovision

Pasaporte a Dublín
The national broadcaster TVE decided in 1970 to produce a TV series in which some of the most popular singers in Spain would compete to represent the country at Eurovision. TVE prepared a shortlist of 20 artists that were important at the time for their popularity, sales or quality; some of them refused to participate because of scheduling conflicts or other reasons, among them Marisol, Juan Pardo, Miguel Ríos and Víctor Manuel. Ten candidates participated at the competition: Cristina, Júnior, Karina, Dova, Jaime Morey, Encarnita Polo, Conchita Márquez Piquer, Los Mismos, Nino Bravo and Rocío Jurado.

The series consisted of twelve shows that aired weekly from October 1970 to December 1970. The shows were produced at Prado del Rey in Pozuelo de Alarcón (Madrid). In the first show (17 October), hosted by Massiel and Julio Iglesias, the candidates were introduced to the audience. The ten following shows centered on one contestant each: the protagonist would host the show and sing several songs from their repertoire, while the rest of contestants would sing a song each related to a particular theme. The schedule was the following:

The final was held on 30 December 1970, hosted by José Luis Uribarri. The winner was decided by a jury panel, consisting of a member of the Spanish Society of Authors and Publishers, a member of the Guild of Entertainment, a representative of the General Administration of Television and Broadcasting, and five additional chairs. Each member of the panel had to award a set of 10-1 points to the acts after each broadcast. Karina was declared winner, but the position in the ranking of the rest of candidates was not disclosed. Magazines Semana and Teleprograma published that Jaime Morey, who would be internally selected to represent Spain at Eurovision the following year, came in second place, while Dova was third.

Despite the popularity of the program, the format of Pasaporte a Dublín was not used again by TVE to choose the Spanish entrant, in fact a national final was not organized again until 1976. The format is considered in Spain a precursor to reality singing competitions like Operación Triunfo in the 2000s.

At Eurovision
Karina was the 6th to perform in the running order, following Germany and preceding France. She received 116 points for her performance, coming in second place.

Voting

References

External links
Video of the introduction show - Pasaporte a Dublín (TVE website)

1971
Countries in the Eurovision Song Contest 1971
Eurovision